Vindenes is a surname. Notable people with the surname include:

Erling Johan Vindenes (1900–1984), Norwegian politician
Helge Vindenes (born 1931), Norwegian diplomat